Conus sulcatus, common name the grooved shell, is a species of sea snail, a marine gastropod mollusk in the family Conidae, the cone snails and their allies.

Like all species within the genus Conus, these snails are predatory and venomous. They are capable of "stinging" humans, therefore live ones should be handled carefully or not at all.

Description
The size of the shell varies between 21 mm and 89 mm. The smooth shell shows revolving grooves crossed by longitudinal striae. The intermediate ridges are flat or rounded. The short spire is carinated, striate, sometimes with distant ompressed tubercles. The ground color of the shell is light yellowish brown, or whitish.

Conantokin-Br is a toxin derived from the venom of Conus sulcatus.

Distribution
This marine species occurs off Japan, Taiwan, in the Bay of Bengal and off the Solomon Islands, New Caledonia and Queensland, Australia.

References

 Bruguière, M. 1792. Encyclopédie Méthodique ou par ordre de matières. Histoire naturelle des vers. Paris : Panckoucke Vol. 1 i-xviii, 757 pp
 Holten, H.S. 1802. Enumeratio Systematica Conchyliae Beat. J.H. Chemnitz. Copenhagen : K.H. Scidelini 88 pp.
 Lamarck, J.B.P.A. de M. 1810. Tableau des espèces. Annales du Muséum National d'Histoire Naturelle. Paris 15: 29–40
 Sowerby, G.B. 1857–1858. Monograph of the genus Conus. 1–56, pls 1-24 in Thesaurus conchyliorum or monographs of genera of shells. London : Sowerby Vol. 3
 Sowerby, G.B. Jr. (1881). Descriptions of eight new species of shells. Proc. Zool. Soc. Lond. (1881): 635–639
 Cernohorsky, W.O. 1978. Tropical Pacific marine shells. Sydney : Pacific Publications 352 pp., 68 pls.
 Coomans, H.E., Moolenbeek, R.G. & Wils, E. 1982. Alphabetical revision of the (sub)species in recent Conidae 5. baccatus to byssinus, including Conus brettinghami nomen novum. Basteria 46(1-4): 3–67
 Motta, A.J. da 1982. Seventeen new cone shell names (Gastropoda: Conidae). Publicaçoes Ocasionais da Sociedade Portuguesa de Malacologia 1: 1–26 
 Röckel, D., Korn, W. & Kohn, A.J. 1995. Manual of the Living Conidae. Volume 1: Indo-Pacific Region. Wiesbaden : Hemmen 517 pp.

External links
 The Conus Biodiversity website
 Cone Shells – Knights of the Sea
 
 Puillandre N., Duda T.F., Meyer C., Olivera B.M. & Bouchet P. (2015). One, four or 100 genera? A new classification of the cone snails. Journal of Molluscan Studies. 81: 1–23

sulcatus
Gastropods described in 1792